Dogtown or Dog Town may refer to:

Entertainment
 Dogtown (film), a 1997 film
 "Dogtown" (The Simpsons), a 2017 season episode
 DogTown, a National Geographic Channel series
 Dogtown, a 2006 television show, starring Geraldine McNulty
 "Dogtown", a song by Harry Chapin from the album Heads & Tales (1972)
 "Dogtown", a song by Yoko Ono from the album A Story (1974)
 "Dogtown", a song by The Fratellis from the album Eyes Wide, Tongue Tied (2015)
 Dogtown and Z-Boys (2001), a 2001 documentary film about skateboarding
 Lords of Dogtown (2005), a 2005 film based on Dogtown and Z-Boys
 Dogtown Records, a record label established by musician Byard Lancaster, active in the 1970s

Places
 Dogtown, California (disambiguation), the name or nickname of several places in California
 Dog Town, California
 Dogtown, El Dorado County, California
 Dogtown, Marin County, California
 Dogtown, Mariposa County, California
 Dogtown, San Joaquin County, California
 Dogtown, Tulare County, California
 Dogtown, DeKalb County, Alabama, an unincorporated community in DeKalb County
 Dogtown, Walker County, Alabama, an unincorporated community in Walker County
 Dogtown, Florida, a community in Gadsden County, Florida
 Dogtown, Massachusetts, a ghost town
 Dogtown, Mississippi, a ghost town in Lafayette County, Mississippi
 Dogtown, St. Louis, Missouri, Irish section comprising several neighborhoods in Missouri
 Dogtown, Clayton/Tamm, St. Louis, a neighborhood in the above
 Dogtown, former name of Okanagan Falls, British Columbia

Other uses
 Dog town, a colloquial name for a colony of prairie dogs